Quanshan Subdistrict is a subdistrict of the city of Zhaoyuan, Shandong, China, covering part of the southern portion of the urban core. , it has 13 residential communities and 10 villages under its administration.

See also 
 List of township-level divisions of Shandong

References 

Township-level divisions of Shandong